Airwaves is a Canadian television dramedy series, which aired on CBC Television in 1986 and 1987.

Plot
The Toronto-filmed show starred Roberta Maxwell as Jean Lipton, a radio talk show host and widowed mother, who lived with her daughter Zoe, played by Ingrid Veninger, and her father Bob, played by Roland Hewgill. Maxwell has indicated that Canadian journalist-activist June Callwood was a basis for her portrayal of Jean.

The show's cast also included Taborah Johnson, Alec Willows, and Kimble Hall. Writers for the series included Judith Thompson, John Frizzell, Susan Martin, Rob Forsythe, Linda Svendsen and Paul Gross.

Production
Some of the early episodes were criticized as clunky, with Ross McLean of The Globe and Mail writing that the show seemed unsure of its identity, and even the producers later acknowledging that they had tried to fit too much into a half-hour show. The show was retooled slightly in its second season, with the writers getting a firmer grasp on the stories they wanted to tell and adding two new characters: Christopher Bolton in the role of Matt, Jean's nephew, and Patrick Rose as Dale, Jean's new coworker at the radio station. Critics responded favourably to the changes, with even McLean himself noting by 1987 that the show had significantly improved.

The show was modestly successful, with an average audience of 850,000 viewers per week in its first season. and 761,000 viewers in its second. Although the CBC was willing to order a third season, the producers decided to end the series as they felt it was better to move on to other projects than to continue tinkering with a show that wasn't getting the ratings they wanted. However, CBC subsequently reran the first two seasons, outside of prime time, in 1990.

The series was repeated on Vision TV from 1989 to 1991.

Episodes

Season one

Season two

References

External links
 

1986 Canadian television series debuts
1987 Canadian television series endings
1980s Canadian comedy-drama television series
CBC Television original programming
Television shows set in Toronto
Television shows filmed in Toronto
Television series about radio
Television series by Alliance Atlantis